Abigail Gawthern (7 July 1757 – 7 January 1822) was a British  diarist and lead manufacturer.

Life
Gawthern was probably born in Nottingham. Her parents were Ann and Thomas Frost. She was named "Abigail Anna" after her father's mother. This was opportune as the Frosts were to inherit a substantial bequest from her grandmother's brother Thomas Secker. Secker had been the Archbishop of Canterbury. After Secker died his will was disputed by Thomas Frost and he managed to persuade the court that £11,000 intended for charity should be added to an existing legitimate bequest to his family. 

From an early age Gawthern kept a diary.

In 1791 Gawthern, husband died. She took control of the family's white lead business and its money and property. She continued to live in their substantial house at 26 Low Pavement in Nottingham. When her parents died in 1801 she received another large inheritance. The business continued and her son briefly led the business until it folded in 1808 due to more efficient methods of production being developed.

Gawthern is remembered because in the early 1800s she to copied her diaries into a single volume that in time would document Nottingham's history for the period 1751–1810. The diaries show how the professional classes lived at that time. In her own street was the home of the "Ladies Assembly" which was run by ladies but which was open to both genders but not the working class.

Gawthern died at her home 26 Low Pavement in 1822. A son, Francis, and a daughter, Anna, survived her.

References

1757 births
1822 deaths
People from Nottingham
English industrialists